Volcanic gases are gases given off by active (or, at times, by dormant) volcanoes. These include gases trapped in cavities (vesicles) in volcanic rocks, dissolved or dissociated gases in magma and lava, or gases emanating from lava, from volcanic craters or vents. Volcanic gases can also be emitted through groundwater heated by volcanic action.

The sources of volcanic gases on Earth include:
 primordial and recycled constituents from the Earth's mantle,
 assimilated constituents from the Earth's crust,
 groundwater and the Earth's atmosphere.
Substances that may become gaseous or give off gases when heated are termed volatile substances.

Composition 

The principal components of volcanic gases are water vapor (H2O), carbon dioxide (CO2), sulfur either as sulfur dioxide (SO2) (high-temperature volcanic gases) or hydrogen sulfide (H2S) (low-temperature volcanic gases), nitrogen, argon, helium, neon, methane, carbon monoxide and hydrogen. Other compounds detected in volcanic gases are oxygen (meteoric), hydrogen chloride, hydrogen fluoride, hydrogen bromide, sulfur hexafluoride, carbonyl sulfide, and organic compounds. Exotic trace compounds include mercury, halocarbons (including CFCs), and halogen oxide radicals.

The abundance of gases varies considerably from volcano to volcano, with volcanic activity and with tectonic setting. Water vapour is consistently the most abundant volcanic gas, normally comprising more than 60% of total emissions. Carbon dioxide typically accounts for 10 to 40% of emissions.

Volcanoes located at convergent plate boundaries emit more water vapor and chlorine than volcanoes at hot spots or divergent plate boundaries. This is caused by the addition of seawater into magmas formed at subduction zones. Convergent plate boundary volcanoes also have higher H2O/H2, H2O/CO2, CO2/He and N2/He ratios than hot spot or divergent plate boundary volcanoes.

Magmatic gases and high-temperature volcanic gases 

Magma contains dissolved volatile components, as described above. The solubilities of the different volatile constituents are dependent on pressure, temperature and the composition of the magma. As magma ascends towards the surface, the ambient pressure decreases, which decreases the solubility of the dissolved volatiles. Once the solubility decreases below the volatile concentration, the volatiles will tend to come out of solution within the magma (exsolve) and form a separate gas phase (the magma is super-saturated in volatiles).

The gas will initially be distributed throughout the magma as small bubbles, that cannot rise quickly through the magma. As the magma ascends the bubbles grow through a combination of expansion through decompression and growth as the solubility of volatiles in the magma decreases further causing more gas to exsolve. Depending on the viscosity of the magma, the bubbles may start to rise through the magma and coalesce, or they remain relatively fixed in place until they begin to connect and form a continuously connected network. In the former case, the bubbles may rise through the magma and accumulate at a vertical surface, e.g. the 'roof' of a magma chamber. In volcanoes with an open path to the surface, e.g. Stromboli in Italy, the bubbles may reach the surface and as they pop small explosions occur. In the latter case, the gas can flow rapidly through the continuous permeable network towards the surface. This mechanism has been used to explain activity at Santiaguito, Santa Maria volcano, Guatemala and Soufrière Hills Volcano, Montserrat. If the gas cannot escape fast enough from the magma, it will fragment the magma into small particles of ash. The fluidised ash has a much lower resistance to motion than the viscous magma, so accelerates, causing further expansion of the gases and acceleration of the mixture. This sequence of events drives explosive volcanism. Whether gas can escape gently (passive eruptions) or not (explosive eruptions) is determined by the total volatile contents of the initial magma and the viscosity of the magma, which is controlled by its composition.

The term 'closed system' degassing refers to the case where gas and its parent magma ascend together and in equilibrium with each other. The composition of the emitted gas is in equilibrium with the composition of the magma at the pressure, temperature where the gas leaves the system. In 'open system' degassing, the gas leaves its parent magma and rises up through the overlying magma without remaining in equilibrium with that magma. The gas released at the surface has a composition that is a mass-flow average of the magma exsolved at various depths and is not representative of the magma conditions at any one depth.

Molten rock (either magma or lava) near the atmosphere releases high-temperature volcanic gas (>400 °C).
In explosive volcanic eruptions, the sudden release of gases from magma may cause rapid movements of the molten rock. When the magma encounters water, seawater, lake water or groundwater, it can be rapidly fragmented. The rapid expansion of gases is the driving mechanism of most explosive volcanic eruptions. However, a significant portion of volcanic gas release occurs during quasi-continuous quiescent phases of active volcanism.

Low-temperature volcanic gases and hydrothermal systems

As magmatic gas travelling upward encounters meteoric water in an aquifer, steam is produced. Latent magmatic heat can also cause meteoric waters to ascend as a vapour phase. Extended fluid-rock interaction of this hot mixture can leach constituents out of the cooling magmatic rock and also the country rock, causing volume changes and phase transitions, reactions and thus an increase in ionic strength of the upward percolating fluid. This process also decreases the fluid's pH. Cooling can cause phase separation and mineral deposition, accompanied by a shift toward more reducing conditions. At the surface expression of such hydrothermal systems, low-temperature volcanic gases (<400 °C) are either emanating as steam-gas mixtures or in dissolved form in hot springs. At the ocean floor, such hot supersaturated hydrothermal fluids form gigantic chimney structures called black smokers, at the point of emission into the cold seawater.

Over geological time, this process of hydrothermal leaching, alteration, and/or redeposition of minerals in the country rock is an effective process of concentration that generates certain types of economically valuable ore deposits.

Non-explosive volcanic gas release 

The gas release can occur by advection through fractures, or via diffuse degassing through large areas of permeable ground as diffuse degassing structures (DDS). At sites of advective gas loss, precipitation of sulfur and rare minerals forms sulfur deposits and small sulfur chimneys, called fumaroles. Very low-temperature (below 100 °C) fumarolic structures are also known as solfataras. Sites of cold degassing of predominantly carbon dioxide are called mofettes. Hot springs on volcanoes often show a measurable amount of magmatic gas in dissolved form.

Current emissions of volcanic gases to the atmosphere 
Present day global emissions of volcanic gases to the atmosphere can be classified as eruptive or non-eruptive. Although all volcanic gas species are emitted to the atmosphere, the emissions of CO2 (a greenhouse gas) and SO2 have received the most study. 

It has long been recognized that eruptions contribute much lower total SO2 emissions than passive degassing does. Fischer et al (2019) estimated that, from 2005 to 2015, SO2 emissions during eruptions were 2.6 teragrams (Tg or 1012g) per year and during non-eruptive periods of passive degassing were 23.2 ± 2Tg per year. During the same time interval, CO2 emissions from volcanoes during eruptions were estimated to be 1.8 ± 0.9 Tg per year and during non-eruptive activity were 51.3 ± 5.7 Tg per year. Therefore, CO2 emissions during volcanic eruptions are less than 10% of CO2 emissions released during non-eruptive volcanic activity.  

The 15 June 1991 eruption of Mount Pinatubo (VEI 6) in the Philippines released a total of 18 ± 4 Tg of SO2. Such large VEI 6 eruptions are rare and only occur once every 50 – 100 years. The 2010 eruptions of Eyjafjallajökull (VEI 4) in Iceland emitted a total of 5.1 Tg CO2. VEI 4 eruptions occur about once per year. 

For comparison, human burning of fossil fuels and production of cement released 36,300 Tg CO2 into the atmosphere in 2015. Therefore, the amount of CO2 emitted due to human activity is 600 times the amount of CO2 annually released by volcanoes. However, some recent volcanic CO2 emission estimates are higher than Fischer et al (2019). The estimates of Burton et al. (2013) of 540 Tg CO2/year and of Werner et al. (2019) of 220 - 300 Tg CO2/year take into account diffuse CO2 emissions from volcanic regions. Even considering the highest estimate of volcanic CO2 emissions of 540 Tg CO2/year, current CO2 emission by human activity of 36,300 Tg CO2/year is 67 times higher.

Sensing, collection and measurement 

Volcanic gases were collected and analysed as long ago as 1790 by Scipione Breislak in Italy.  The composition of volcanic gases is dependent on the movement of magma within the volcano. Therefore, sudden changes in gas composition often presage a change in volcanic activity. Accordingly, a large part of hazard monitoring of volcanoes involves regular measurement of gaseous emissions. For example, an increase in the CO2 content of gases at Stromboli has been ascribed to injection of fresh volatile-rich magma at depth within the system. 

Volcanic gases can be sensed (measured in-situ) or sampled for further analysis. Volcanic gas sensing can be:
 within the gas by means of electrochemical sensors and flow-through infrared-spectroscopic gas cells
 outside the gas by ground-based or airborne remote spectroscopy e.g., Correlation spectroscopy (COSPEC), Differential Optical Absorption Spectroscopy (DOAS), or Fourier Transform Infrared Spectroscopy (FTIR).

Sulphur dioxide (SO2) absorbs strongly in the ultraviolet wavelengths and has low background concentrations in the atmosphere. These characteristics make sulphur dioxide a good target for volcanic gas monitoring. It can be detected by satellite-based instruments, which allow for global monitoring, and by ground-based instruments such as DOAS. DOAS arrays are placed near some well-monitored volcanoes and used to estimate the flux of SO2 emitted. The Multi-Component Gas Analyzer System (Multi-GAS) is also used to remotely measure CO2, SO2 and H2S. The fluxes of other gases are usually estimated by measuring the ratios of different gases within the volcanic plume, e.g. by FTIR, electrochemical sensors at the volcano crater rim, or direct sampling, and multiplying the ratio of the gas of interest to SO2 by the SO2 flux.

Direct sampling of volcanic gas sampling is often done by a method involving an evacuated flask with caustic solution, first used by Robert W. Bunsen (1811-1899) and later refined by the German chemist Werner F. Giggenbach (1937-1997), dubbed Giggenbach-bottle. Other methods include collection in evacuated empty containers, in flow-through glass tubes, in gas wash bottles (cryogenic scrubbers), on impregnated filter packs and on solid adsorbent tubes.

Analytical techniques for gas samples comprise gas chromatography with thermal conductivity detection (TCD), flame ionization detection (FID) and mass spectrometry (GC-MS) for gases, and various wet chemical techniques for dissolved species (e.g., acidimetric titration for dissolved CO2, and ion chromatography for sulfate, chloride, fluoride). The trace metal, trace organic and isotopic composition is usually determined by different mass spectrometric methods.

Volcanic gases and volcano monitoring 

Certain constituents of volcanic gases may show very early signs of changing conditions at depth, making them a powerful tool to predict imminent unrest. Used in conjunction with monitoring data on seismicity and deformation, correlative monitoring gains great efficiency. Volcanic gas monitoring is a standard tool of any volcano observatory. Unfortunately, the most precise compositional data still require dangerous field sampling campaigns. However, remote sensing techniques have advanced tremendously through the 1990s. The Deep Earth Carbon Degassing Project is employing Multi-GAS remote sensing to monitor 9 volcanoes on a continuous basis.

Hazards 

Volcanic gases were directly responsible for approximately 3% of all volcano-related deaths of humans between 1900 and 1986. Some volcanic gases kill by acidic corrosion; others kill by asphyxiation. Some volcanic gases including sulfur dioxide, hydrogen chloride, hydrogen sulfide and hydrogen fluoride react with other atmospheric particles to form aerosols.

Gallery

See also 
Amygdule

References

External links 
 USGS Volcano Hazards Program: Volcanic Gases and Their Effects
IVHHN; USGS: The Health Hazards of Volcanic and Geothermal Gases. A Guide for the Public.

Volcanic degassing
Gases
Greenhouse gases